Suresh Niroshan (born 29 November 1985) is a Sri Lankan cricketer. He played 65 first-class and 47 List A matches for multiple domestic sides in Sri Lanka between 2004 and 2017. He made his first-class debut for Chilaw Marians Cricket Club in the 2004–05 Premier Trophy on 1 October 2004.

See also
 List of Chilaw Marians Cricket Club players

References

External links
 

1985 births
Living people
Sri Lankan cricketers
Chilaw Marians Cricket Club cricketers
Kalutara Town Club cricketers
Moors Sports Club cricketers
Saracens Sports Club cricketers
Place of birth missing (living people)